

Joop van Zijl (born 23 January 1935) is a Dutch former journalist and television presenter. From 1977 to 1996 he was a news presenter of the Dutch public news broadcaster NOS Journaal.

See also
 List of news presenters

References

External links
 

1935 births
Living people
People from Haarlem
Dutch television journalists
Dutch television presenters
Dutch television news presenters
Dutch radio presenters